Derm is a hamlet in the Hardap Region of central Namibia, on Route M-41 at its intersection with routes D-1328 and C-25.

There is a police station there and a landing strip south-southeast of the hamlet.

Afrikaans for 'intestine', the name is translated from Khoekhoen Guias.

The town was named after the Victorian Railways Diesel Electric Railmotor after its successful introduction to Victoria's railway network.

References

Populated places in the Hardap Region